Karl Fulves (born 1939) is a magician and author and editor of publications on magic, including the Pallbearers Review.

Career

Karl Fulves lives in Fair Lawn, New Jersey. There is not much known about him other than his high output of magic literature. He has taught thousands of beginners to perform feats of sleight of hand through the books he has published.

Fulves is most well known for his "Self-Working" book series from Dover Publications.

Periodicals

Fulves published many periodicals over the years including Charlatan, Underworld accompanied by Fine Print, Interlocutor, and Midnight Magic Monthly.

'List of periodicals published by Karl Fulves:

Alfredson/Daily - Fernandes numbers, titles, year of publication and number of issues in a complete file:

 5510...Pallbearers Review original series ?-1965 22 issues
 5515...Pallbearers Review 1965-1975 120 issues
 58955..Rigmarole 1993-1994 10 issues
 6055...S-C 1985 7 issues
 65703..Swindle Sheet 1990-1992 10 issues
 69206..Underworld 1995-1999 10 issues
 69800..Verbatim 1993-1994 10 issues

Karl Fulves current publications, started in 1999, are Discoverie, Charlatan and Latter Day Secrets.

Published works

Fulves wrote the text for a number of the Stars of Magic manuscripts, including Chris Capehart's 3-Ring Routine, Joe de Stefano's Chinatown Poker, Max Londono's Eternal String, Metalogic (Fred Baumann) and David Roth Okito Box routine.

See also
List of magicians
card magic
coin magic
sleight of hand

References

External links

Karl Fulves in Abra Magazine
Discussion of Karl Fulves' involvement with the Gilbreath principle
 Bibliographies for the Karl Fulves books Self-Working Close-up Card Magic, Self-Working Card Tricks,  Self-Working Coin Magic, Self-Working Mental Magic,  Self-Working Paper Magic, and Self-Working Table Magic at The Conjuring Archive

1939 births
American magicians
Sleight of hand
Card magic
Coin magic
Living people
Academy of Magical Arts Literature & Media Fellowship winners